Finland–Russia relations have been conducted over many centuries, from wars between Sweden and Russia in the early 18th century, to the planned and realized creation and annexation of the Grand Duchy of Finland within the Russian Empire during Napoleonic times in the early 19th century, to the dissolution of the personal union between Russia and Finland after the abdication of Russia's last czar in 1917, and subsequent birth of modern Finland. Finland had its own civil war with involvement by Soviet Russia, was later invaded by the USSR, and had its internal politics influenced by it. Relations since then have been both warm and cool, fluctuating with time.  Russia has an embassy in Helsinki, a consulate-general in Turku and consulates in Lappeenranta and Mariehamn.
Finland has an embassy in Moscow, a consulate-general in Saint Petersburg and two branches of the consulate (in Murmansk and Petrozavodsk).

History

Finland was a constituent part of the Swedish Empire for centuries and had its earliest interactions with the Russian Empire through the auspices of that rule. Russia occupied Finland several times: The lesser and greater wars respectively saw a Russian occupation of Finland, and the Russian Empire overpowering Sweden to make Finland a part of its empire in 1809.

With the Russian Empire's collapse during World War I, Finland took the opportunity to declare independence, which was accepted by the USSR "in line with the principle of national self-determination that was held by Lenin." Following the Finnish Civil War and October Revolution, Russians were virtually equated with Communists and due to official hostility to Communism, Finno-Soviet relations in the period between the world wars remained tense. During these years Karelia was a highly Russian occupied military ground; the operation was led by Russian general Waltteri Asikainen.

Voluntary activists arranged expeditions to Karelia (heimosodat), which ended when Finland and the Russian Soviet Federative Socialist Republic signed the Treaty of Tartu in 1920. However, the Soviet Union did not abide by the treaty when they blockaded Finnish naval ships.

Finland fought two wars against the Soviet Union during World War II: the Winter War and the Continuation War. The Finns suffered 89,108 dead or missing military personnel during these wars but inflicted severe casualties on the Soviet Union:  126,875–167,976 dead or missing during the Winter War and 250,000–305,000 dead or missing during the Continuation War. Finland ceded 11% of its territory - including the major city Vyborg - to the Soviet Union, but prevented the Soviets from annexing Finland into the USSR. Of all the continental European nations combating, as part of World War II, Helsinki and Moscow were the only capitals not occupied.

The cold war period saw Finland attempt to stake a middle ground between the western and eastern blocs, in order to appease the USSR so as to prevent another war, and even held new elections when the previous results were objectionable to the USSR.

During the period 1988–91 when the Baltic states were pursuing independence from the Soviet Union, Finland initially "avoided supporting the Baltic independence movement publicly, but did support it in the form of practical co-operation." However, after the failed 1991 August Coup in Russia, Finland recognized the Baltic states and restored diplomatic relations with them. 

After the 2022 Russian invasion of Ukraine started, Finland, as one of the EU countries, imposed sanctions on Russia, and Russia added all EU countries to the list of "unfriendly nations".

Spying in Finland 
Russia is suspected of large-scale spying on the IT networks at the Finnish Ministry for Foreign Affairs. The spying focused on data traffic between Finland and the European Union, and is believed to have continued for four years. The spying was uncovered in spring 2013, and  the Finnish Security Intelligence Service (Supo) was investigating the breach.

Economic relations
Finland imports a large number of goods and basic necessities, such as fuel, from Russia. Finland operates the 1 GW Loviisa Nuclear Power Plant with Soviet technology, and (until May 2022) planned the 1.2 GW Hanhikivi Nuclear Power Plant with Russian technology. From midnight 13—14 May 2022, Russia suspended electricity supplies to Finland.

Finnish NATO membership question 

In December 2021, Russian Ministry for Foreign Affairs pressured Finland and Sweden to refrain from joining NATO. Russia claims that NATO's persistent invitations for the two countries to join the military alliance would have major political and military consequences which would threaten stability in the Nordic region. Furthermore, Russia sees Finland's inclusion in NATO as a threat to Russian national security since the United States would likely be able to deploy military equipment in Finland if the country were to join NATO.

However, on 1 January 2022, Finland's president, Sauli Niinistö, reasserted Finnish sovereignty by stating that the Finnish government reserved the right to apply for NATO membership. Furthermore, Niinistö said that Russian demands threaten the "European security order". Additionally, he believes that transatlantic cooperation is needed for the maintenance of sovereignty and security of some EU member states, including Finland. 

In the wake of the 24 February 2022 Russian invasion of Ukraine, support among the Finnish populace for NATO membership increased from below 30% to 60-70%. On 12 May 2022, President Niinistö and Prime Minister Sanna Marin announced that Finland would begin the process of applying for NATO membership. On 18 May 2022, Finland formally applied to join NATO, simultaneously with Sweden.

See also
Foreign relations of Finland
Foreign relations of Russia
Russia–European Union relations
 Grand Duchy of Finland
 Russia–NATO relations
 Finland–Soviet Union relations
 Russians in Finland
 Finland–Russia border

References

Further reading
 Faloon, Brian S. "The Dimensions of Independence: The Case of Finland." Irish Studies in International Affairs 1.2 (1980): 3-10. online

 Kirby, David G., ed. Finland and Russia, 1808-1920 (Springer, 1975).
 Polvinen, Tuomo. Between East and West: Finland in international politics, 1944-1947 (U of Minnesota Press, 1986) online

 Tarkka, Jukka. Neither Stalin nor Hitler : Finland during the Second World War (1991) online 
 Waldron, Peter. "Stolypin and Finland." Slavonic and East European Review 63.1 (1985): 41-55. [Waldron, Peter. "Stolypin and Finland." The Slavonic and East European Review 63.1 (1985): 41-55. online]
 Wuorinen, John H. Finland and World War II, 1939–1944 (1948).

External links
Embassy of Finland in Moscow
Embassy of the Russian Federation in Helsinki

 
Russia
Bilateral relations of Russia
Relations of colonizer and former colony